S. Gopal Reddy is an Indian cinematographer, turned screenwriter, director and producer, known for his works in Telugu cinema and Bollywood.
 In 1990, he co-produced the blockbuster Kshana Kshanam, under his production house Durga Arts. He has received two Filmfare Best Cinematographer Award (South) for Varsham and Sri Ramadasu in 2004 and 2006 respectively.

Personal life 
He is married to Rasool Ellore's sister, Michaela, and has a son and daughter (Sundeep and Sandhya). Sundeep, his son, is also a professional cinematographer.

Filmography 
As Producer or Writer
 Om Namo Venkatesaya (2017)
 Drushyam (2015)
 Shirdi Sai (2012)
 Vastadu Naa Raju (2011)
 Jhummandi Naadam (2010)
 Don (2007)
 Rakhi (2006) (also cinematographer)
 Sri Ramadasu (2006)
 Meri Biwi Ka Jawaab Nahin (2004)
 Naa Autograph (2004) (also cinematographer and director)
 Varsham (2004)
 Deewaar (2004)
 Santosham (2002)
 Prematho Raa (2001)
 Maa Balaji (1999)
 Sooryavansham (1999)
 Sisindri (1998)
 Akkada Ammayi Ikkada Abbayi (1996)
 Hello Brother (1994 film) (1996)
 Gharana Bullodu (1995)
 Criminal (1994)
 Govindha Govindha (1993)
 Nippuravva (1992)
 Coolie no.1 (1991)
 Babai Abbai (1991) (also Cinematographer)
 Kshana Kshanam (1991) (also cinematographer)

As Technician
  Mahakavi Kshetrayya (1976) (operatorative cameraman)
 Bhakta Kannappa (1976) (operative cameraman)
 Alluri Seetarama Raju (1974) (operative cameraman)
 Andala Ramudu (1973) (operative cameraman)
 Bhakta Tukaram (1973) (operative cameraman)
 Mosagallaku Mosagadu (1971) (Operative cameraman)

Awards 
Filmfare Awards South
Best Cinematographer (2004) – Varsham
Best Cinematographer (2006) – Sri Ramadasu

Nandi Awards
Nandi Award for Best Cinematographer for Ananda Bhairavi – 1983
Nandi Award for Best Cinematographer for Kshana Kshanam – 1991
Nandi Award for Best Cinematographer for Hello Brother – 1994

References

External links 
 

Living people
Telugu film cinematographers
1951 births
Film producers from Andhra Pradesh
Telugu screenwriters
Telugu film producers
Filmfare Awards South winners
Cinematographers from Andhra Pradesh
People from Krishna district
Screenwriters from Andhra Pradesh
20th-century Indian dramatists and playwrights
21st-century Indian dramatists and playwrights
20th-century Indian photographers
21st-century Indian photographers
Hindi film cinematographers